Arthrobacter nanjingensis is a Gram-positive and non-motile bacterium species from the genus Arthrobacter which has been isolated from forest soil in Nanjing in Jiangsu Province, China.

References

External links
Type strain of Arthrobacter nanjingensis at BacDive -  the Bacterial Diversity Metadatabase

Bacteria described in 2015
Micrococcaceae